The 1956–1957 St. Francis Terriers men's basketball team represented St. Francis College during the 1956–57 NCAA men's basketball season. The team was coached by Daniel Lynch, who was in his ninth year at the helm of the St. Francis Terriers. The team was a member of the Metropolitan New York Conference and played their home games at the II Corps Artillery Armory in Park Slope, Brooklyn.

Before the season, Walter Adamushko was named team captain by Coach Lynch. Also prior to the season, Lynch was interviewed by the New York Times and he expressed pessimism about the teams progress, since he lost several players to graduation. Last year, Lynch's Terriers were nationally ranked and made it to the NIT semifinals.  
 
The Terriers participated in the 3rd Annual NAIA Tip-Off Tournament, which took place in Omaha, Nebraska. They defeated Eau Claire State in the first round, Gustavus Adolphus in the second round, but lost to Texas Southern in the Championship game.

Roster

Schedule and results

|-
!colspan=12 style="background:#0038A8; border: 2px solid #CE1126;;color:#FFFFFF;"| Regular Season

  

  

  

  

                      

source

NBA Draft
At the end of the season Walter Adamushko was selected with the 42nd overall pick by the Detroit Pistons.

Awards

Alvin Innniss
All-Metropolitan Selection by the Metropolitan Basketball Writers’ Association.

References

External links
 St. Francis Terriers men's basketball official website

St. Francis Brooklyn Terriers men's basketball seasons
St. Francis
Saint Francis
Saint Francis